The 1907 Kingston earthquake which shook the capital of the island of Jamaica with a magnitude of 6.2 on the moment magnitude scale on Monday January 14, at about 3:30 p.m. local time (20:36 UTC), is described by the United States Geological Survey as one of the world's deadliest earthquakes recorded in history. Every building in Kingston was damaged by the earthquake and subsequent fires, which lasted for three hours before any efforts could be made to check them, culminating in the death of about 1,000 people, and causing approximately $30 million in material damage ($ million in ). Shortly after, a tsunami was reported on the north coast of Jamaica, with a maximum wave height of about 2 m (6–8 ft).

Tectonic setting
Jamaica lies within a complex zone of faulting that forms the boundary between the Gonâve Microplate and the Caribbean Plate. To the east of the island the main fault is the Enriquillo–Plantain Garden fault zone while to the west the main structure is the Walton fault zone, both major sinistral (left lateral) strike-slip faults. The transfer of plate boundary displacement between these major fault zones takes place on a series of NW-SE trending faults, such as the Wagwater Belt. The overall tectonic setting is one of transpression at this restraining bend in the plate boundary.

Damage

The greatest damage occurred at Kingston and at Buff Bay and Annotto Bay on the northern coast. Eighty-five percent of buildings in Kingston were destroyed by the shaking, which was followed by a fire that destroyed parts of the business and warehouse districts. The Elder-Dempster passenger steamer Port Kingston, which was under repair in Kingston Harbour at the time, was threatened by fire on the nearby wharf. A rapid temporary repair allowed her to be moved to the safety of an unaffected railway wharf. A suspension bridge was destroyed at Port Maria.

Characteristics

Earthquake
The main shock lasted for about 35 seconds after some minor initial tremors and was accompanied by a roaring sound. The intensity of the shaking grew quickly to a first and strongest climax.  The intensity then lessened before again reaching a second weaker climax. There were eighty aftershocks recorded up to 5 February, while the strongest of all was recorded on 23 February.

The epicenter of the earthquake is not well constrained. The only seismograph in Jamaica at the time was put out of action by the earthquake. The rupture may have been on an eastward continuation of the South Coast Fault Zone, within the Wagwater Belt or in the Blue Mountains. The greatest felt intensity was noted for areas built on unconsolidated sands and gravels. To the east of Kingston, along the Palisadoes, there were sandblows and surface faulting associated with areas of subsidence and flooding.

Tsunami

After the earthquake, tsunami were observed along much of the north coast of Jamaica at Hope Bay, Port Antonio, Orange Bay, Sheerness Bay, Saint Ann's Bay, Buff Bay, Port Maria and Annotto Bay; there were also some reports of waves along the south coast. Seiches were reported in Kingston Harbour.

Aftermath
The Port Kingston, the only passenger ship in Kingston Harbour, was used as a makeshift hospital, with improvised operating theatres in three parts of the ship and on the adjoining wharf. Kingston Public Hospital, despite loss of its water supply, continued to function throughout the following night.

See also
 List of earthquakes in 1907
 List of earthquakes in the Caribbean

References

External links 
 1907 Earthquake A pictorial guide to the 1907 Kingston earthquake.
 "Kingston Wrecked By Earthquake"; The Christian Herald; Jan. 30, 1907, New York; 1907, p. 87.

1907 Kingston earthquake
Kingston
1907 in Jamaica
1907 tsunamis
January 1907 events
History of Kingston, Jamaica
1907 disasters in North America